Luiz Carlos Tavares Ferrão Amorim (born 27 September 1977) is a Brazilian former professional road cyclist. He most notably won the Brazilian National Time Trial Championships five times.

Major results

2003
 1st  Time trial, National Road Championships
 1st Stage 6 (ITT) Tour de Santa Catarina
2004
 1st  Time trial, National Road Championships
 1st Overall 
1st Stage 4a (ITT)
 2nd Overall Volta do Rio de Janeiro
 6th Overall Tour do Brasil
1st Stage 6 (ITT)
2005
 3rd Time trial, National Road Championships
 9th Time trial, Pan American Road Championships
2006
 2nd Time trial, National Road Championships
2007
 5th Time trial, National Road Championships
2008
 3rd  Time trial, Pan American Road Championships
2009
 1st Overall Giro do Interior de São Paulo
1st Stage 4 (ITT)
2010
 1st  Time trial, National Road Championships
2012
 1st  Time trial, National Road Championships
 7th Overall Vuelta del Uruguay
2013
 1st  Time trial, National Road Championships
2014
 3rd Time trial, National Road Championships
2016
 3rd Time trial, National Road Championships

References

External links

1977 births
Living people
Brazilian male cyclists
Brazilian road racing cyclists
People from Osasco
20th-century Brazilian people
21st-century Brazilian people